Comparative Biochemistry and Physiology Part C: Toxicology & Pharmacology  is a peer-reviewed scientific journal that covers research in biochemistry and physiology.

External links 

Biochemistry journals
Physiology journals
Elsevier academic journals